A. F. Theriault & Son Ltd is a privately owned shipyard located in Meteghan River, Digby County, Nova Scotia, Canada. It was founded by Augustin Theriault in 1938.  The shipyard has built a variety of marine vessels. Past projects include the Boston fireboat American United, built in 2011. A current series of vessels are Hammerhead Target Drones, remote controlled high-speed drones used to train naval units in five countries.

References

External links
List of Ships Built "A. F. Theriault", Shipbuilding History

Shipbuilding companies of Canada
Canadian boat builders
Digby County, Nova Scotia
Boatyards
Companies established in 1938
1938 establishments in Nova Scotia